The 1832 United States presidential election in Illinois took place between November 2 and December 5, 1832, as part of the 1832 United States presidential election. Voters chose five representatives, or electors to the Electoral College, who voted for President and Vice President.

Illinois voted for the Democratic Party candidate, Andrew Jackson, over the National Republican candidate, Henry Clay, and the Anti-Masonic Party candidate, William Wirt. Jackson won Illinois by a margin of 36.61%. This is the most recent election in which Edwards County voted for the Democratic candidate.

As of 2020, this remains the strongest performance by a Democrat in Illinois.

Results

See also
 United States presidential elections in Illinois

References

Illinois
1832
1832 Illinois elections